Coker Creek  is an unincorporated community in Monroe County, Tennessee, United States. Coker Creek had a post office from October 26, 1841, to September 27, 2008; it still has its own ZIP code, 37314. The population of the zipcode area is 147.

Coker Creek lies in the southern Appalachian Mountains (specifically, the Unicoi Mountains) completely surrounded by the Cherokee National Forest, and just west of the Tennessee-North Carolina state line. Tellico Mountain lies to the north, Farner Mountain to the south, Unicoi Mountain to the east, and Cataska Mountain to the west. There are homes and businesses, 11 graveyards, nine churches, and many hiking trails and artisan shops as well as a Christian summer camp, Smoky Mountain Christian Camp. It is also home to a recreational retreat, Coker Creek Village. The area is known for its trout fishing and the mountains are home to rhododendron, laurel, ferns and the many species of trees native to this area. Gold was discovered here long before the California 49ers headed west.

Education
Monroe County Schools operates public schools. Coker Creek  School serves the community.

References

External links

Unincorporated communities in Monroe County, Tennessee
Unincorporated communities in Tennessee